"And the Night Stood Still" is a song written by Diane Warren and performed by Dion with backing vocals by Patty Smyth and Dave Edmunds.  The song reached No. 16 on the adult contemporary chart and No. 75 on the Billboard Hot 100 in 1989.  It was featured on his 1989 album, Yo Frankie.

The song was produced and arranged by Edmunds.

A music video was produced for the song and aired on MTV.

Other versions 
Smokie released a version of the song on their 1998 album, Wild Horses – The Nashville Album and a live version on their 2010 album Take a Minute.

References 

1989 songs
1989 singles
Songs written by Diane Warren
Dion DiMucci songs
Smokie (band) songs
Arista Records singles